Jaloux means jealous in French. It is also a surname. It may refer to:

People
Edmond Jaloux (1878-1949), French novelist, essayist, and critic

Film and television
Jaloux, French title for the 2010 Canadian film Suspicious directed by Patrick Demers
L'amant jaloux, full title L'amant jaloux, ou Les fausses apparences, a French comédie mêlée d'ariettes in three acts by André Grétry

Music
"Jaloux" (Bilal Hassani song), song from his 2019 album Kingdom
"Jaloux" (Dadju song)
"Jaloux" (Skinz song), 2017 song by Skinz from the album Ingen Drama

See also
Morne Jaloux, a town in Saint George Parish, Grenada
Jealous (disambiguation)